Sri Ram Dayal Khemka Vivekananda Vidyalaya ( Vivekananda Vidyalaya ) was established in 1982 in Thiruvottiyur and is one of the oldest schools in that region. It is a part of the Vivekananda Educational Society and follows the CBSE curriculum. It started off by acquiring Bala Saraswati Mandir in Tondiarpet in 1974. Land was acquired with the help of Ravi Prakash Khemka in Thiruvottiyur in 1982 where the school now stands. The school has been affiliated with Central board of Secondary Education since 1983.

Cultural Programs
The school celebrates tradition with major festivals on Guru Poornima ( Teacher's day ), Krishna Jayanthi, Republic Day, Independence Day and Annual day. Cultural programs generally involve plays/dramas enacted by Children on Guru Poornima and Krishna Jayanthi which is popular among locals. Bhajans are conducted weekly where Devotional songs are sung by the students. Slokas frequently recited in the Bhajans include Kanda Sasti Kavasam, Hanuman chalisa, Mahishasura Mardhini sloka and Athithya Hridayam.

Vidya Bharati
The School is affiliated to Vidya Bharati Akhil Bharatiya Shiksha Sansthan which is a network of schools and institutions of higher education run by the Rashtriya Swayamsevak Sangh which has close to 20,000 schools under its banner.

Sister Schools
The school has also set up its Sister Schools in Annai Sivagami Nagar in 1998, Madanlal Khemani Vivekananda Vidyalaya at Gummidipoondi in 2002 and Jothi Nagar in 2009.

External links

References

Vidya Bharati schools
Private schools in Chennai
Education in Tiruvallur district